Glyptoxanthus is a genus of crabs in the family Xanthidae, containing eight species. It was originally erected by Alphonse Milne-Edwards in 1879 for six species previously placed in the genus Actaea and elsewhere. Although previously included in subfamily Euxanthinae, the genus has a quite distinct morphology from other genera in that group, and was placed in 2011 in the new, monotypic subfamily, Glyptoxanthinae by Jose Christopher Mendoza and Danièle Guinot.

List of species

 Glyptoxanthus angolensis (Brito Capello, 1866)
 Glyptoxanthus cavernosus (A. Milne-Edwards, 1878)
 Glyptoxanthus corrosus (A. Milne-Edwards, 1869)
 Glyptoxanthus erosus (Stimpson, 1859)
 Glyptoxanthus hancocki Garth, 1939
 Glyptoxanthus labyrinthicus (Stimpson, 1860)
 Glyptoxanthus meandricus (Klunzinger, 1913)
 Glyptoxanthus vermiculatus (Lamarck, 1818)

References

Xanthoidea